James McCartney (born 1977) is an English musician.

James McCartney may also refer to:
Paul McCartney (born 1942, full name James Paul McCartney), English singer and father of the above
James R. McCartney (1920–2011), American politician
James Alexander George Smith McCartney (1945–1980), politician from the Turks and Caicos Islands
James McCartney, of the Baltimore riot of 1861
James A. McCartney (1835–1911), American lawyer and politician
James Paul McCartney (TV program), a 1973 television special

See also
James Macartney (disambiguation)